The Oath is a shoot 'em up video game programmed by Jonathan Small with art by Sascha Jungnickel and published by Attic Entertainment Software for the Amiga in 1991.

Gameplay

Reception

The Oath received mostly positive reviews, including being given the scores of 50% from Amiga Action, 74% from Amiga Joker, 76% from Génération 4, 85% from Joystick, and 70% from Power Play.

References

External links
The Oath at Lemon Amiga
The Oath at the Amiga Hall of Light

1991 video games
Amiga games
Amiga-only games
Horizontally scrolling shooters
Science fiction video games
Single-player video games
Video games developed in Germany
Video games featuring female protagonists
Video games set in outer space
Attic Entertainment Software games